Boero is an Italian surname. Notable people with the surname include:

 Alejandra Boero (1918–2006), Argentine theater actress and director
 Felipe Boero (1884–1958), Argentine composer and music educator

 Guillermo Estévez Boero (1930–2000), Argentine student activist, lawyer and Socialist politician (PSP)

Italian-language surnames